Veldanda is a Mandal in Nagarkurnool, Telangana, India.

Mandal Parishath

ZPTC member

Institutions
 Primary School
 Girls Upper Primary School
 Zilla Parishad High School for Girls 
 Zilla Parishad High School
 Government Junior College

Villages
The villages in Veldanda mandal include:
 Ajilapur 	
 Bhairapoor 	
 Bollampally 	
 Chandrayanpalle 	
 Chedurvalli 	
 Cherkur 
 Chokkanapally	
 Chowderpally 	
 Gokaram
 Jupally 	
 Kotra 	
 Kuppagandla 	
 Peddapur 	
 Pothepalle 	
 Rachur 	
 Sheriappareddipalle 	
 Thandra
 Veldanda
 Lingareddypally
 Konetivada
 Gundala
 bandonipally
 Kantonipally
 Challapally
 Ankamonikunta
 Narayanapur
 Raghaipally
 Thimmanonipally
 Buddonipally
 Kareevanipally
 Erravally

References

Mandals in Nagarkurnool district